Perry Oliver Hooper Jr. (born October 5, 1954), is an American politician. A Republican, Hooper served in the Alabama House of Representatives for District 73 from 1984 until 2003.

Early life
Hooper is the son of Perry Hooper Sr. He graduated from Auburn University.

Career
In 1982, Hooper ran for the Alabama House of Representatives for the 81st district. He lost in the general election to the Democratic Party nominee, Ham Wilson Jr. Running for the 73rd district in a special election in 1983, Hooper defeated Wilson. Hooper served until 2003, after he lost renomination in 2002 to David Grimes.

Hooper was the co-chair of Donald Trump's 2016 presidential campaign in Alabama. After Jeff Sessions resigned from the United States Senate to become attorney general of the United States, Hooper sought the appointment to succeed Sessions in the Senate. Hooper was one of six finalists considered by Governor Robert Bentley. When Luther Strange was appointed to the Senate, Hooper endorsed him and declined to run against him in the 2017 special election to fill the remainder of the term.

Personal life
Hooper and his wife, Judy, have three children, two who were running backs for the Auburn Tigers football team, and another, a placekicker for the South Carolina Gamecocks football team.

Perry was arrested on August 23, 2022, on charges of first-degree sex abuse for an incident that occurred on August 16. Hooper was accused of grabbing an unnamed female from behind, fondling her breasts, and thrusting his pelvis against her backside.

References

External links

1954 births
20th-century American politicians
21st-century American politicians
American United Methodists
Auburn University at Montgomery alumni
Insurance agents
Living people
Republican Party members of the Alabama House of Representatives
Politicians from Montgomery, Alabama
Thomas Goode Jones School of Law alumni
2016 United States presidential electors